Nathan Miller may refer to:

Nathan Miller (figure skater) (born 1988), American pairs skater
Nathan Miller (Rhode Island shipbuilder) (1743–1790), politician, Congressional delegate, militia general
Nathan H. Miller (born 1943), politician in Virginia
Nathan Lee Miller (1866–1933), ninth lieutenant governor of Alabama
Nathan L. Miller (1868–1953), Governor of New York